Raphitoma margaritata is an extinct species of sea snail, a marine gastropod mollusc in the family Raphitomidae.

Description

Distribution
Fossils of this extinct marine species were found in Oligocene strata in France.

References

 Lozouet (P.), 1999 Nouvelles espèces de Gastéropodes (Mollusca: Gastropoda) de l'Oligocène et du Miocène inférieur d'Aquitaine (Sud-Oust de la France. Partie 2. Cossmanniana, t. 6, vol. 1–2, p. 1-68
 Lozouet (P.), 2017 Les Conoidea de l’Oligocène supérieur (Chattien) du bassin de l’Adour (Sud-Ouest de la France). Cossmanniana, t. 19, p. 1-179

margaritata
Gastropods described in 1978